Lewis Corston (1876-1931) was an Australian rules footballer for  and North Adelaide. He was made captain of Port Adelaide at the end of 1906 and for the 1907 season.

References

1931 deaths
Port Adelaide Football Club (SANFL) players
North Adelaide Football Club players
Australian rules footballers from South Australia
1876 births